Goutham Nanda is a 2017 Indian Telugu-language action drama film written and directed by Sampath Nandi. The film stars Gopichand in a double role along with Hansika Motwani and Catherine Tresa while Mukesh Rishi, Sachin Khedekar, and Nikitin Dheer appear in supporting roles. The film has music composed by S. Thaman. The plot follows two lookalikes, Goutham and Nanda, who meet while trying to end their lives. Goutham is a billionaire's spoiled son who wants to feel emotions and Nanda is a poverty-stricken software engineer who wants to become a billionaire. They decide to swap their identities for a month and eventually face challenges from each other as they both start savoring the lives they wanted to live. 

The film was released theatrically on 28 July 2017 where it received positive reviews with praise for the production values, action sequences, performances, soundtrack and dialogues. Despite failing commercially, it became the highest grossing film in Gopichand's career.

Plot
Goutham Ghattamaneni is the only son of Ghattamaneni Vishnu Prasad, the 50th richest billionaire in the world. He does not have any emotions and leads a luxurious life in Bangalore, Karnataka. Mugdha, the daughter of Vishnu Prasad's business partner Mudra, is deeply in love with Goutham. At a party, a waiter spills food on his jeans, making Goutham slap and insult him. The waiter calls him a spoiled brat who doesn't know himself, leading Goutham to realize that he does not have any individual identity without his father. In an attempt to end his life, he crashes his car into another person, who turns out to be his doppelganger Nanda Kishore. Both of them reveal their stories to each other. Nanda hails from a lower-middle-class family, living in a slum in Hyderabad with his parents and sister, along with Spoorthi, who is in love with him. Nanda's aspiration to develop an app fails, due to which his father sends him to Bangalore to get a job. However, he chooses to end his life which would enable his family to claim insurance. Now, Goutham is also fed-up with an opulent lifestyle and wants to feel the emotions of living in poverty. Both of them decide to exchange their lives for a month, which would expose them to experience the lifestyle that they have been craving for, after which Goutham would be introduced to the world as the sole heir of his father's wealth. They spend a night in a hotel learning about each other and fitting into each other’s shoes to begin their new lives.

Goutham starts rough, but with some words from Nanda's father for not taking up a job and returning home but living with Nanda's family, he experiences all the emotions that he has been longing for and helps them by being a better son than Nanda could ever be. On the other hand, Nanda has the perfect beginning, except for a few questions from his staff. Goutham starts to fall for Spoorthi and Nanda for Mugdha. Meanwhile, Mudra and Goutham's CSO Gowda plan to kill Goutham. After a failed attempt to kill Nanda (who they think is Goutham), they realize that Goutham had switched places with Nanda and plan to finish him off in Hyderabad. They make several attempts at killing Goutham, though they fail. Goutham realizes that even Nanda is trying to kill him when he found out an imprint of one of his exercise shoes on the mud, even though his family (Nanda’s) is collateral damage. When confronted about the same, Nanda confesses that he did all this for money and so he had joined hands with Mudra and Gowda when he found out that the duo was trying to kill him.

Soon, Nanda frames Goutham by publicly murdering their slum corporator's son Bujji, but Goutham escapes the cops and confronts Nanda in the presence of his family (Goutham’s), who were manipulated by Nanda (whom they think is Goutham). They fail to recognize that Nanda is in Goutham’s place, and they hand Goutham over to the cops. Goutham escapes the cops with the help of Mugdha, who knows that he is Goutham. They arrive at the spot where Spoorthi has been held hostage by Nanda, who also kills Mudra. A fight breaks out between Goutham, Nanda, and Gowda which leads to the death of Gowda followed by another fight on the chopper in which Nanda ends up dead by falling off. Later, Goutham is introduced as the legal heir to his father’s wealth but he announces his venturing towards the path of humanity and donates the entire wealth to a charity, and when asked for an autograph he signs Goutham Nanda. Mugdha is made the CEO of his father's company, and he shares his life with Nanda's parents and Spoorthi. The film ends with Gautama Buddha's saying Greed for money is the root of all evil.

Cast

Gopichand in a dual role as Goutham Ghattamaneni and Nanda Kishore 
Hansika as Spoorthi
Catherine Tresa as Mugdha
Mukesh Rishi as Mudra, Mugdha's father 
Nikitin Dheer as Gowda 
Sachin Khedekar as Ghattamaneni Vishnu Prasad, Goutham's father
Chandra Mohan as Nanda Kishore's father
Seetha as Satya, Nanda Kishore's mother
Ajay as Borabanda Bujji Yadav
Vennela Kishore as Kishore
Tanikella Bharani as Waiter
Annapurna as Lakshmamma 
Vidyullekha Raman as Spoorthi's friend
Shreeradhe Khanduja as Nanda's sister
Anupama Kumar
Jaya Prakash Reddy as JP Gowda
Duvvasi Mohan
Karate Kalyani
Thotapalli Madhu
Ranam Venu 
Chanti
Temper Vamsi as Goon
Bithiri Sathi as Himself

Soundtrack
Music composed by S. Thaman. The soundtrack was released by Zee Music Company.

Reception 
Sowmya Sruthi of The Times Of India gave the film a rating of 3/5 and wrote "Goutham Nanda is definitely worth a watch and a treat for fans of Gopichand, who will get to see two of him". Hemanth Kumar of Firstpost gave the film a rating of 2.5/5 and wrote "There’s barely anything dramatic in the film’s first half and save for a chuckle or two, thanks to Vennela Kishore and Bithri Sathi, Goutham Nanda is quite dull for most part of its run-time". Manoj Kumar R of Indian Express gave the film a rating of 1/5 and wrote "Goutham Nanda exposes director-writer Sampath, who seems incapable of creativity and logical thinking".

References

External links
 

2017 films
2010s Telugu-language films
2017 action films
Indian action films
2017 masala films
Films shot in Dubai
Films scored by Thaman S
Films about poverty in India
Telugu films remade in other languages
Films about lookalikes
Films directed by Sampath Nandi